Amarwara Assembly constituency is one of the 230 Vidhan Sabha (Legislative Assembly) constituencies of Madhya Pradesh state in central India.

It is part of Chhindwara Lok Sabha constituency. It has been reserved for Scheduled Tribe Candidates.

Members of Legislative Assembly

As a constituency of Madhya Pradesh (Nagpur)

As a constituency of Madhya Pradesh (Bhopal)

Election results

2018

2013

See also
Amarwara

References

Assembly constituencies of Madhya Pradesh
Chhindwara district